Olga Lengyel (19 October 1908 – 15 April 2001) was a Hungarian Jewish prisoner at the Auschwitz-Birkenau concentration camp, who later wrote about her experiences in her book Five Chimneys. She was the only member of her immediate family to survive the Holocaust.

Life and career
Lengyel was a trained surgical assistant in Cluj, Romania, working in the hospital where her husband, Dr Miklós Lengyel, was director. In 1944, she was deported with her husband, parents and two children to the Auschwitz-Birkenau concentration camp; she was the only member of her family to survive. She wrote about her experiences in a memoir, Five Chimneys: The Story of Auschwitz, first published in France in 1946 as Souvenirs de l'au-delà. (A later American paperback edition was entitled I Survived Hitler's Ovens; more recent editions have used the title Five Chimneys: A Woman Survivor's True Story of Auschwitz.)

In the memoir, Lengyel provides a chilling account of her encounter with Irma Grese, who mercilessly beat the most beautiful women in the camp, chose those who would be operated on by the SS doctor, and who would be sent to the gas chambers. She did so with great enthusiasm. She was quick to beat Lengyel, a Jew who had medical training and had been singled out to help the SS doctor. Ultimately, Lengyel was spared, but the chapter in which Grese is described ends on a chilling note. The survivor describes how she "saw Irma Greise [sic] coming from the Fuehrerstube, her whip in hand, to designate the next batch for the gas chamber". Her children were murdered in the gas chamber. 

I cannot acquit myself of the charge that I am, in part, responsible for the destruction of my own parents and of my two young sons. The world understands that I could not have known, but in my heart the terrible feeling persists that I could have, I might have, saved them.

After the war, Lengyel immigrated to the United States, where she founded the Memorial Library chartered by the University of the State of New York. "The Library, headquartered in her elegant residence, is Olga's legacy, carrying on her mission of actively educating future generations about the Holocaust, other genocides, and the importance of human rights." She died of cancer in New York on 15 April 2001 at the age of 92.

Legacy
In 1954 she moved to Cuba with her second husband Gustav Aguire, which they had to flee during the Cuban revolution in 1959. The property of US citizens has been expropriated by the Cuban government, including their art collection. Claims for return were always ignored.
In New York in 1962, Lengyel donated the Memorial Library, which is dedicated to commemorating the Holocaust, under the care of the State University of New York in Manhattan. In her will, she bequeathed her property in Manhattan and the right to the art collection to the Memorial Library.
Following the political détente between the US and Cuba in 2015, the legal claims to the art collection were memorialized by the Memorial Library. According to the list drawn up by Lengyel, the collection includes works by Hans Memling, Anthony van Dyck, Francisco Goya and Edgar Degas.

In 2006, the Memorial Library began the Holocaust Educator Network, a national program for teachers committed to Holocaust education, especially in rural schools and small towns, in partnership with the National Writing Project's Rural Sites Network.

See also
List of Holocaust survivors

References

External links
 Profile, Thememoriallibrary.org; accessed 7 April 2018.

1908 births
2001 deaths
Auschwitz concentration camp survivors
Hungarian Jews
Hungarian writers
Hungarian emigrants to the United States
Jewish American art collectors
Jewish concentration camp survivors
The Holocaust in Hungary